Smuin Contemporary Ballet, formerly known as Smuin Ballet, is a touring ballet company based in San Francisco, California.  Smuin Ballet performs its season in multiple venues: the Dean Lesher Center in Walnut Creek, the Mountain View Center for the Performing Arts in Mountain View, the Sunset Center in Carmel, the Yerba Buena Center for the Arts and The Palace of Fine Arts Theater in San Francisco.

History

Founding 

Michael Smuin, a former dancer, choreographer and co-artistic director with the San Francisco Ballet and an award-winning choreographer, founded Smuin Contemporary Ballet in 1994.

Then known as Smuin Ballet, the "American ballet company with a distinctly American accent… infused ballet with the rhythm, speed, and syncopation of American popular culture.” Michael Smuin created about 40 ballets for the Smuin Ballet company. After his sudden passing in 2007, Smuin's longtime “muse and mainstay,”  Celia Fushille, was named Artistic Director of Smuin. As a founding member of the company, Fushille created roles in some of Michael Smuin's most memorable ballets, from the romantic Roxane in Cyrano to the lusty Lola-Lola in The Blue Angel. Fushille's vision for the Company, beyond the role of conservator and prime presenter of Michael Smuin’s ballets, is to bring to the stage new works by both world-renowned and emerging choreographers, as well as support young aspiring choreographers within the Smuin company.

Company

Artistic Director 
 Celia Fushille

Ballet Mistress 
 Amy London

Choreographer in Residence 
 Amy Seiwert

Principal Dancers 

 Brandon Alexander
 Tessa Barbour
 Ian Buchanan 
 Claire Buehler
 Stéphano Candreva
 Maggie Carey
 Mengjun Chen
 Cassidy Isaacson
 Tess Lane
 Marc LaPierre
 Terez Dean Orr
 John Speed Orr
 Lauren Pschirrer
 Yuri Rogers
 Brennan Wall

Touring and performing 

Smuin performs over 60 shows per season in theaters throughout San Francisco, Walnut Creek, Mountain View, and Carmel. Based in the San Francisco Bay Area, Smuin also tours across the country to venues including the Joyce Theater in New York; Montana, Michael Smuin's home state; southern California; Colorado; and Alaska, as well as throughout Europe and Australia.

Smuin has launched over 50 new works into the American dance repertoire, including many choreographed by Michael Smuin, as well as over 10 ballets created by Amy Seiwert, Smuin's Choreographer in Residence .  Many notable choreographers such as Trey McIntyre, Helen Pickett, Ma Cong, Adam Houghland, and Val Caniparoli have premiered works with Smuin. Many of the choreographers have also given Smuin the opportunity to perform their works, including Jiří Kylián, Twyla Tharp, Annabelle Lopez Ochoa, and more .

References

External links 
 Smuin Ballet Website

Ballet companies in the United States
Organizations based in San Francisco
Culture in the San Francisco Bay Area
Dance in California